Blue Amazon is an English electronic music act founded by Lee Softley and James Reid. Reid left the group in 2000 and Softley adopted the name as a solo moniker. Their 1990s singles "No Other Love", "And Then the Rain Falls" and "Coming Home" all entered the UK Singles Chart, and they released their debut and only studio album, The Javelin, in 1997. In addition, they have remixed work for musicians including Sasha, Skunk Anansie, New Order and Madonna.

Discography

Studio albums

Compilation albums

Singles

References

External links
Blue Amazon at Discogs

English electronic music duos
Musical groups established in 1993
Musical groups from West Yorkshire
Musicians from Huddersfield
Remixers